As in the Kingdom of Jerusalem, the County of Tripoli had a smattering of offices: seneschal, constable, marshal, chamberlain, and chancellor.  

The Great Officers of the County of Tripoli were:

Seneschal
Raymond (1117)
Brunel (1139–1143)

Constable
William Peter (1106), perhaps just Marshal of the Camp
William Raymond (1106), perhaps just Marshal of the Camp
Roger (1110–1117)
Silvius (1139)
Rainier (1140–1143)
Arnald de Crest (1151–1155)
Hugh Sine Censu (1161–1164)
Raymond de Gibelet (1181–1183)
Odo of Saint-Omer (1194)
Gerard of Ham (1198–1217)
John (1217), also marshal (see below)
Thomas of Ham (1227–1255)
William Farabel (1277–1282)

Marshal
Falcrand (1142–1145)
William de Lulen (1151)
N. de Monteprasto (1163)
Raymond (1177–1179)
John (1187–1217), also constable (see above)
John (1241–1278)

Chamberlain
Walter de Margat (1137)
Rainald (1139)
Albert (1143)

Chancellor
Pons (1126), also archdeacon of Saint Paul
Jotron (1139–1143)
Peter (1142–1143)
Alberic (1163)
Matthew (1174–1187)
John (1202), perhaps John of Corbonio, who was chancellor of Antioch under Bohemond IV

See also
Officers of the Kingdom of Jerusalem
Officers of the Kingdom of Cyprus
Officers of the Principality of Antioch
Officers of the County of Edessa

References
La Monte, John L. Feudal Monarchy in the Latin Kingdom of Jerusalem 1100 to 1291. Medieval Academy of America, 1932. Cf. pp. 252–60.

County of Tripoli